Anatrachyntis falcatella is a moth in the family Cosmopterigidae. It was described by Henry Tibbats Stainton in 1859, and is known from India, China, Sri Lanka and Australia.

The larvae feed on Hibiscus rosa-sinensis.

References

Moths described in 1859
Anatrachyntis
Moths of Asia
Moths of Australia